Marvin Stinson is an American boxer.

Life and career 
Stinson was born in North Philadelphia. He began boxing at the Police Athletic League.

Stinson competed at the 1974 World Amateur Boxing Championships, winning the silver medal in the heavyweight event. He also won four Golden Gloves titles in Philadelphia, Pennsylvania.

References

External links 

Living people
Year of birth missing (living people)
American male boxers
Heavyweight boxers
AIBA World Boxing Championships medalists